Brørby is a Norwegian surname. Notable people with the surname include:

Anders Brørby (born 1984), Norwegian composer and sound artist
Berit Brørby (born 1950), Norwegian politician

See also
Wade Brorby (born 1934), American jurist

Norwegian-language surnames